Henry Cogswell College is a former private institution of higher learning that was based in Washington state from 1979 to 2006. The college offered bachelor's degrees in business administration, computer science, digital arts, electrical engineering, mechanical engineering, mechanical engineering technology, and professional management. It was named after temperance movement crusader Henry D. Cogswell. Historically, the college had an enrollment of 300 students that relied mainly on Boeing-related tuition.

History

Henry Cogswell College was founded in 1979 in Kirkland, Washington as Cogswell College North (at the time, an affiliate of Cogswell College in Sunnyvale, California), largely to provide engineering education to local Boeing employees. The college also operated night and summer classes at Shoreline Community College before permanently moving to south Kirkland.

The college moved to Everett, located near Boeing's largest assembly plant, in 1996, leasing space in a former Bon Marché department store. In 2000, the college moved into the historic Federal Building in downtown Everett, spending $2 million to renovate the 1917-built office building. Off-campus classes were also held at a Boeing facility in the south Puget Sound (about 30 miles from Everett) to accommodate students living in that area. Limited classes continued to be offered at the Boeing facility even after the main campus moved to Everett. The institution closed on September 1, 2006, due to a decline in enrollment and substantial deficit.

References

External links
Cogswell College North newspaper ad from 1984.

Educational institutions established in 1979
Educational institutions disestablished in 2006
Defunct private universities and colleges in Washington (state)
1979 establishments in Washington (state)
2006 disestablishments in Washington (state)
Education in Everett, Washington